Izazul Mulk (born; 28 June 1967) is a Pakistani politician from Lower Dir District, belonging to Jamaat-e-Islami Pakistan, who =currently serves as a member of the Khyber Pakhtunkhwa Assembly. He also serves as a member of various committees.

Political career
Izazul Mulk was elected as the member of the Khyber Pakhtunkhwa Assembly on ticket of Jamaat-e-Islami Pakistan from PK-95 (Lower Dir-II) in by-polls election held in May 2015, after the seat became vacant in March 2015 when the party's leader, Siraj ul Haq, was elected as senator.

References

1967 births
Living people
Pashtun people
Khyber Pakhtunkhwa MPAs 2013–2018
People from Lower Dir District
Jamaat-e-Islami Pakistan politicians